Michael Saward may refer to:

 Michael Saward (British Army officer) (1841–1928), British Army officer
 Michael Saward (priest) (1932–2015), British Anglican priest, author and hymnist
 Michael Saward (political theorist) (born 1960), Australian political theorist